Uncial 0185 (in the Gregory-Aland numbering), is a Greek uncial manuscript of the New Testament, dated palaeographically to the 4th-century.

Description 

The codex contains a small parts of the First Epistle to the Corinthians 2:5-6,9,13; 3:2-3, on one parchment leaf (19 cm by 15 cm). This leaf has survived in a fragmentary condition. The text is written in two columns per page, 24 lines per page, in uncial letters.

The Greek text of this codex is a representative of the Alexandrian text-type. Aland placed it in Category II.

It was written and found in Egypt. Currently it is dated by the INTF to the 4th-century. Karl Wessely published its transcription.

The codex currently is housed at the Papyrus Collection of the Austrian National Library (Pap. G. 39787) in Vienna.

See also 

 List of New Testament uncials
 Textual criticism

References

Further reading 

 Walter Till, Papyrussammlung der Nationalbibliothek in Wien: Katalog der koptischen Bibelstücke. Die Pergamente, ZNW 39 (1940), pp. 1–57. 
 

4th-century biblical manuscripts
Greek New Testament uncials
Biblical manuscripts of the Austrian National Library